Fatmir Vata (born 20 September 1971) is an Albanian former professional footballer who played primarily as an attacking midfielder. He began his footballing career with local side 31 Korriku, before moving to Tirana in 1991 where he would remain for two seasons before moving abroad. He joined Croatian club Orijent before moving to Samobor two years later in 1995, where he'd remain for three seasons. Vata joined Prva HNL side Slaven Belupo and spent one season with the club before moving to Vukovar '91. He joined newly promoted 2. Bundesliga and German side Waldhof Mannheim in January 2000 where he established himself in the first team and helped the side to a fourth-place finish in the 2000–01 2. Bundesliga, just one point behind automatic promotion.

Vata is best known for his time at Arminia Bielefeld, which he joined in 2001 and helped the club promotion to the Bundesliga in 2002. Despite suffering relegation back to 2. Bundesliga, he helped his side achieve promotion once again the following year. He left the club at the end of the 2006–07 season after 140 games and 20 goals, making him the current third-highest foreign appearance maker for the club. Vata moved to 2. Bundesliga side TuS Koblenz where he spent two years before joining 3. Liga side Wuppertaler SV in 2009, where he retired at the end of the 2009–10 season.

He came out of retirement to play for amateur side FC 08 Boffzen in 2013.

Club career
Vata was born in Rrëshen, Albania to a Catholic family.

In 2004, he became Albania's Footballer of the Year.

In August 2009, Vata joined Wuppertaler SV from TuS Koblenz for the 2009–10 season on a free transfer.

International career
He made his debut for Albania in an April 1996 friendly match against Bosnia and earned a total of 17 caps, scoring no goals. His final international was an October 2002 European Championship qualification match against Russia.

International statistics

Post-playing career
Following his retirement Vata worked as a coach for Hannover 96 and VfL Bochum.

Honours
Individual
 Albania's Footballer of the Year: 2004

References

External links
 

1971 births
Living people
People from Mirditë
Association football midfielders
Albanian footballers
Albania international footballers
KS Burreli players
KF Tirana players
HNK Orijent players
NK Samobor players
NK Slaven Belupo players
HNK Vukovar '91 players
SV Waldhof Mannheim players
Arminia Bielefeld players
TuS Koblenz players
Wuppertaler SV players
Kategoria e Parë players
Kategoria Superiore players
Croatian Football League players
Bundesliga players
2. Bundesliga players
3. Liga players
Albanian expatriate footballers
Expatriate footballers in Croatia
Albanian expatriate sportspeople in Croatia
Expatriate footballers in Germany
Albanian expatriate sportspeople in Germany